The Queens Head is a public house  in the village of Sandridge to the north of St Albans, Hertfordshire, England.

The timber framed building is weather-boarded. It is listed as grade II by Historic England and is dated as "C17 and earlier". The nearby medieval church and its 20th century lychgate are also listed buildings.

References

External links

http://www.thequeensheadsandridge.co.uk/

Pubs in the City and District of St Albans
Grade II listed pubs in Hertfordshire
Timber framed pubs in Hertfordshire